Henry Myerscough (1927 in Islington, London – 2007) was a British violist.

In addition to solo work and teaching, he formed the Fidelio Quartet with his brother, the violinist Clarence Myerscough, and performed for many years as a session musician, including The Beatles' "White" Album and Quatermass.

He played a viola by luthier Gasparo da Salò.

References

1927 births
2007 deaths
British classical violists
20th-century classical musicians
20th-century violists